"Goodbye" is a song by Kazakh record producer Imanbek and English EDM group Goodboys. It was released on 18 December 2020, via Teta Records. It also marks the first collaboration of the tripartite.

Composition
The song is written in the key of B♭ Minor, with a tempo of 125 beats per minute.

Music video
An accompanying music video was directed by Charlie Robins. The video catches the "excitement and suspense of a horse chariot race", an "intrinsic part of traveller culture".

Track listing

Credits and personnel
Credits adapted from AllMusic.

 Jimmy Conway – composer
 Goodboys – primary artist, producer
 Joshua Grimmett – composer, musical producer, vocals
 Imanbek – composer, musical producer, primary artist, producer
 Kirill Lupinos – composer
 Conor Manning – composer
 Steve Manovski – composer
 Joris Mur –  musical producer, producer
 Tom Norris – mastering engineer, mixing
 Timur Shafiev – composer
 Ethan Shore – musical producer

Charts

Weekly charts

Year-end charts

References

2020 singles
2020 songs
Imanbek songs
Goodboys songs